The Cumberland Presbyterian Church, also known as the Peoria Musicians Club, is the oldest standing church building in Peoria, Illinois, United States. The church was constructed in 1856 as the First Cumberland Presbyterian Church.  It was used by various churches and a synagogue until 1913, when it was bought by the American Federation of Musicians Local 26.  The building was added to the National Register of Historic Places on March 18, 1980.  It is now a branch of Busey Bank.

Notes

Churches completed in 1856
National Register of Historic Places in Peoria County, Illinois
Churches on the National Register of Historic Places in Illinois
Churches in Peoria, Illinois
Former music venues in the United States
Music venues in Illinois
Former Presbyterian churches in the United States
Greek Revival church buildings in Illinois
19th-century Presbyterian church buildings in the United States
Former churches in Illinois
Presbyterian churches in Illinois
Cumberland Presbyterian Church
American Federation of Musicians
1856 establishments in Illinois